Far Off Grace is the third full-length album by the German progressive metal band Vanden Plas. It was later re-released in 2004 as a special edition with two bonus track and multimedia material.

Track listing

Personnel 
Andy Kuntz – vocals, backing vocals, cover concept
Stephan Lill – guitars, backing vocals
Günter Werno – keyboards, backing vocals
Torsten Reichert – bass
Andreas Lill – drums, backing vocals

Production 
Vanden Plas – producer
Dennis Ward – producer, engineer, mixing, backing vocals
Arsenic – cover design and layout
Artur Bente – photography

References 

1999 albums
Vanden Plas (band) albums
Inside Out Music albums